Kopu can refer to:

Kopu or Malara, a god in Oceania
Kopu, New Zealand, in the Thames-Coromandel District

See also
Kõpu (disambiguation)